The Sony Ericsson W518a (W508 for international regions) is a clamshell style mobile phone and media player in the Walkman series. The phone was released on July 15, 2009. Among its features are Voice-guided GPS, a 3.2-megapixel digital camera, a music player and a Facebook app. Sony Ericsson markets the phone as a phone that offers the "mobile entertainment experience".  The phone also has an FM radio. In addition to black, the phone is also made in red.

Notes

External links
 Official Sony W518a promotion site
 Official AT&T W518a site
 W518a at Best Buy
 W518a at Amazon.com

W518
Mobile phones introduced in 2009